Henri-Louis de Boulainvilliers de Croy  was a French Navy officer. He served in the War of American Independence. He was a member of the Society of the Cincinnati.

Biography 
Boulainvilliers was born to a noble family from Brest. His father was a Navy captain. His son, Joseph de Boulainvilliers de Croy, was also a Navy officer and later a Chouan insurgent.

Boulainvilliers joined the Navy as a Garde-Marine in 1735. He was promoted to Lieutenant in 1751, and to Captain in 1757.

He commanded the 80-gun Languedoc as flag captain to Estaing. He took part in the Battle of Rhode Island, the Battle of Grenada on 6 July 1779, and in the Siege of Savannah.

Boulainvilliers' superiors saw him as having reach the limits of his abilities, and advised against his promotion to a general officer position.
Boulainvilliers was promoted to Chef d'escadre on 5 May 1780, and was retired from the Navy on 13, a week later.

Sources and references 
 Notes

References

 Bibliography
 
  
 

External links
 

French Navy officers